Aaron Levinson (born July 2, 1963) is a Grammy award-winning producer, musician, composer and record label owner  He has produced and released dozens of albums since starting his career with Inner City Records in 1981. Range Recording Studios, Staff,

Early life
Levinson was born in Philadelphia and is a graduate of the Philadelphia High School for the Creative and Performing Arts.

Career
In 2003, Levinson co-composed and produced the score for the Cinemax documentary “How Do You Spell Murder?” directed by Oscar-winning directors Alan and Susan Raymond. His recent productions include Jeff Thomas' All Volunteer Army, El Malito and Rediscovering Lonnie Johnson. Levinson is an ASCAP-affiliated songwriter and publisher and has an international co-publishing agreement with Evergreen Music for his musical compositions in 43 countries around the world.

Levinson is the owner of Range Recording Studios in Ardmore, Pennsylvania and served previously as president of Bell Tower Music. He was an adjunct faculty member at Temple University from 2010 to 2016. From 2014 until 2019, he was an appointed master lecturer at The University Of The Arts. He is a former governor of the Philadelphia chapter of the National Academy of Recording Arts and Sciences.

Discography
Baby Loves Salsa, (Producer), 2008
Pulpo's Hot Bread, Pulpo, (Production Consultant), 2008
Rediscovering Lonnie Johnson, Jef Lee Johnson, (Producer), 2008
Resist Temptation, (Harmonious Wail, Audio Engineer, Audio Production, Liner Notes, Mixing, Producer), 2008
(R)evolucion, Jose Conde (Producer), 2007
The Harlem Experiment, The Harlem Experiment (Audio Production, Liner Notes, Mixing, Producer), 2007
3, Zaperoko (Executive Producer, Mixing), 2006
Lost Classics of Salsa, Vol. 2, (Executive Producer, Reissue Producer), 2006
Mellow Hip-Hop Sessions, (Producer), 2006				
Movement: Detroit's Electronic Music Festival 04, (Producer), 2005
Across 110th Street, Spanish Harlem Orchestra, (Audio Production, Engineer, Executive Producer, Mastering, Mixing, Producer), 2004
All Night Long, Layo & Bushwacka!, (Producer), 2004		
Lost Classics of Salsa, Vol. 1, (Executive Producer, Reissue Producer), 2003
Musica Universal, Truco & Zaperoko, (Executive Producer, Liner Notes), 2003		
The Detroit Experiment, The Detroit Experiment, (Audio Production, Clapping, Producer), 2003		
Worldwide 3, Gilles Peterson (Producer), 2003	
Medicated Magic, The Dirty Dozen Brass Band, (Liner Notes), 2002
Un Gran Dia en el Barrio, Spanish Harlem Orchestra, (Producer, Recording Director), 2002		
Philadelphia Experiment, Philadelphia Experiment, (Handclapping, Mixing, Producer, Sound Effects), 2001	
Al Santiago Presents Tambo, Tambo, (Liner Notes, Reissue Producer), 1998
Regalo del Ciego (Blindman's Gift), Son de Loma, (Reissue Producer), 1998			
Roberto Clemente: Un Tributo Musical (Tribute in Song), (Executive Producer), 1998	
Soneando Trombon, Jimmy Bosch, (Mixing, Producer), 1998
Tipiqueros, Bongo-Logic (Liner Notes, Reissue Producer), 1998	
Live from Sour City, (Producer), 1997		
The Vegan Zombie's Lament, (Harmonious Wail Mixing, Producer), 1997

Awards and honors
2005 Grammy Winner: Salsa Album of the Year
2004 Grammy Nominee: Salsa Album of the Year
2003 Grammy Nominee: Salsa Album of the Year
2003 Billboard Award Winner: New Salsa Artist of the Year
2001 Latin Grammy Award Nominee: Traditional Tropical Album

References

External links

Aaron Levinson studio website

Aaron Levinson at AllMusic
Aaron Levinson at Discogs

Living people
American writers about music
Record producers from Pennsylvania
American salsa musicians
Grammy Award winners
Musicians from Philadelphia
Philadelphia High School for the Creative and Performing Arts alumni
Temple University faculty
University of the Arts (Philadelphia) faculty
1963 births